The Llotja de Barcelona or Llotja de Mar (Catalan for Llotja of Barcelona or Sea Llotja) is a building located on Passeig d'Isabel II, in the Ciutat Vella district of Barcelona. It was formerly a meeting place for the city's merchants, and was used for trading. The current 18th century neoclassical building is the successor of other older constructions such as the old medieval building, one of the finest double-storey civil Gothic buildings in the Mediterranean.

History 

Pere Llobet built a porch between 1352 and 1357 next to the beach, in the place where, possibly, there was a previous one. Later, in 1358, a chapel was added. This construction, which probably remained unfinished, soon became too small and Peter the Ceremonious authorized the construction of a large enclosed hall (which is still preserved), which also protected the merchants from the inclemency of the weather and the effects of the sea.

Pere Arvei was the architect in charge of directing the works, which took place between 1384 and 1397. It is a large hall with three naves separated by semicircular arcades supported by four columns. The ceiling is made of wood. Although it was in operation since 1397, other constructions were added later, such as the upper floor where the Consulate of the Sea was located (1457-1459), built under the direction of Marc Safont. It had a courtyard and a small chapel, built between 1452-1453.

On the occasion of the marriage of Archduke Charles of Austria and the German princess Elisabeth Christine of Brunswick, the Palace of the Llotja de Mar in Barcelona was the setting for the performance on August 2, 1708 of the first Italian opera in Catalonia: Il più bel nome ("The most beautiful name"), by the Venetian composer Antonio Caldara.

The building suffered the effects of the siege of 1714 and became a barracks. Later it was recovered for the city and it was decided to modernize the building. Joan Soler i Faneca was in charge of the remodeling. The works were carried out between 1774 and 1802, and were finished by the architects Tomàs Soler i Ferrer —son of Soler Faneca— and Joan Fàbregas. Of this extension it is worth mentioning the exterior complex that completely covers the Gothic hall (Hall of Contracts), the neoclassical rooms of the Board of Trade and the courtyard, where the Fountain of Neptune, by Nicolau Travé, is preserved.

From 1775 the Free School of Design was established, which gave rise to the School of Arts and Crafts of Barcelona (known as Escola de la Lonja) and the Reial Acadèmia Catalana de Belles Arts de Sant Jordi, which still occupies the upper part, although the school is no longer located in this building.

It was the headquarters for many years of the Barcelona Stock Exchange. It is currently the headquarters of the Cambra de Comerç and the Reial Acadèmia Catalana de Belles Arts de Sant Jordi, which preserves an important art collection.

The building 
The building has a height of 22 meters and its facades are topped by 4 pediments whose importance indicates the importance of the street through which it is accessed, or the importance it had at the time of construction: when it was inaugurated, there was still no Passeig d'Isabel II, occupied by the Muralla de Mar.The Salón de Contrataciones (Hall of Recruitment), a large room 14 meters high, with 4 columns and 6 arches that support the wooden slabs of the upper floor, stands out from the medieval period. On the spandrels of the arches, you can see the coats of arms of the king and the city alternating since the construction of the building was promoted by Peter IV of Aragon and the Consell de Cent.

The modern building is the most important work of neoclassicism in Barcelona. It stands out in the treatment of the facades, the courtyard and the splendid staircase, with a model work of stone stereotomy. The courtyard and the staircase are decorated with various sculptures: the Fountain of Neptune, by Nicolau Travé, at the foot of which are two nereids by Antoni Solà; in the corners of the courtyard there are four niches with allegories of continents: Europe and Asia, by Josep Bover, and Africa and America, by Manuel Olivé; finally, at the foot of the staircase there are two allegories of Commerce and Industry, by Salvador Gurri.

Some of the rooms on the main floor maintain the decoration of the time and preserve numerous works of art. Among them, in the Salón Dorado (Golden Hall), the sculpture Lucrecia, by Damià Campeny, one of the great works of European neoclassical sculpture, stands out.

The building has been the headquarters of the Consulate of the Sea and the Royal Barcelona Board of Trade, among other institutions. It is currently the corporate headquarters of the Cambra Oficial de Comerç, Indústria i Navegació de Barcelona.

It houses, on the upper floors, the Reial Acadèmia Catalana de Belles Arts de Sant Jordi, with an important museum of works of art, especially from the 18th and 19th centuries.

Image gallery

See also 

 Architecture of Barcelona
 List of Bienes de Interés Cultural in the Province of Barcelona
 Palace of the Viceroy (Barcelona)

References

Bibliography

External links 

 Casa Lonja de Mar

14th-century architecture in Spain
Neoclassical architecture in Spain
Gothic architecture in Catalonia
Buildings and structures completed in 1802